One Sky is a jazz album composed by Ryan Cohan, performed by the RC Sextet and released 16 October 2007 on Motéma Music.

The album's name comes from the concept that all of humanity lives under one sky and that, therefore, man cannot operate as a solitary creature. The cover art is a photo taken by Ryan Cohan.

The Ryan Cohan Sextet received a grant from Chamber Music America to compose the suite "One Sky: Tone Poems for Humanity," which makes up the second half of the album.

Track listing

All songs written by Ryan Cohan, except where noted.

"Double Agent" – 7:36
"Easy For You To Say" – 7:57
"Six Fortunes" – 7:07
"Checkmate" – 7:50
"Lush Life" (Strayhorn) – 7:29
"I. Into Being, Pt. 1" – 2:31
"I. Into Being, Pt. 2" – 7:18
"II. Wonder & Response" – 6:51
"III. Awe" – 4:47
"IV. Hope" – 9:21

Personnel

Ryan Cohan Sextet
Ryan Cohan – piano
Bob Sheppard – tenor & soprano saxophones, flute
Geof Bradfield – tenor & soprano saxophones, bass clarinet
Tito Carillo – trumpet, flugelhorn
James Cammack – double bass
Lorin Cohen – double bass
Kobie Watkins – drums

Additional personnel
Jea Christophe-Leroy – percussion
Ruben Alvarez – shekere

References

External links
Album site at Motéma Music

2007 albums
Ryan Cohan albums